During the 2006–07 English football season, Queens Park Rangers F.C. competed in the Football League Championship.

Season summary
On 28 June 2006, Holloway was put on Gardening leave and eventually left for Plymouth Argyle and Gary Waddock was appointed full-time manager. On 20 September 2006, after a poor set of results had left QPR bottom of the table, Waddock was replaced by John Gregory. Waddock did, however, stay at the club as assistant manager. Gregory's appointment caused a schism among QPR fans, some of whom saw Gregory's friendship with controversial chairman Gianni Paladini as a conflict of interest. After a decent start with successive victories over Hull City and Southampton, Rangers form dipped before winning three on the bounce (including a victory at (then) league leaders Cardiff City). Unfortunately, results did not continue to improve, and relegation looked a distinct possibility for Gregory's men. However, following a fine late season run, QPR beat Cardiff 1–0 at Loftus Road on 21 April 2007 to secure their Championship status for another year.

Final league table

Results
Queens Park Rangers' score comes first

Legend

Football League Championship

FA Cup

League Cup

Players

First-team squad
Squad at end of season

Left club during season

Statistics

Goalscorers

Clean sheets

References

Notes

Queens Park Rangers F.C. seasons
Queens Park Rangers